Sir Samuel Falle  (19 February 1919 – 20 February 2014) was a British diplomat and decorated Royal Navy officer. He served as Ambassador to Kuwait and Sweden, and High Commissioner to Singapore and Nigeria.

Career
Falle was educated at Victoria College, Jersey. He served in the Royal Navy 1937–48 and was awarded the Distinguished Service Cross "for gallantry in the face of overwhelming odds whilst serving in  during her last action in the Java Sea on 1st March, 1942".

Encounter had taken part in the Second Battle of the Java Sea, suffered major damage and was scuttled by her crew. They were subsequently rescued by the Imperial Japanese Navy destroyer Ikazuchi commanded by Shunsaku Kudō. Falle spent the next three and a half years as a prisoner of war.

Falle joined the Foreign Service in 1948 and served at Shiraz, Tehran, Beirut and Baghdad. He was Consul-General at Gothenburg 1961–63, head of the UN department at the Foreign Office 1963–67 and accompanied Lord Shackleton on a mission to Aden in 1967. He was deputy High Commissioner at Kuala Lumpur 1967–69, ambassador to Kuwait 1969–70, High Commissioner to Singapore 1970–74, ambassador to Sweden 1974–77, and High Commissioner to Nigeria 1977–78. He then retired from the Diplomatic Service and joined the European Commission, becoming EC delegate to Algeria 1979–82, then working as a consultant on development aid in Africa including evaluation of EEC aid to Zambia 1983–84, and Swedish aid to Swaziland in 1986.

Falle was appointed CMG in the Queen's Birthday Honours of 1964, knighted KCVO in 1972 and given the additional knighthood of KCMG in the New Year Honours of 1979. The King of Sweden made him a Commander Grand Cross of the Order of the Polar Star in 1975.

Falle sought out the location of the grave of Shunsaku Kudō, to whom he held enormous gratitude for rescuing him during the Second Battle of the Java Sea, and visited there on 7 December 2008. Kudo was such a humble man that his family came to know of his deed for the first time when Falle visited them.

Publications
My Lucky Life : In War, Revolution, Peace and Diplomacy (autobiography), Book Guild, Lewes, 1996.

References
FALLE, Sir Sam, Who's Who 2013, A & C Black, 2013; online edn, Oxford University Press, Dec 2012

External links
Sir Sam Falle (obituary), The Times, London, 28 April 2014

1919 births
2014 deaths
People educated at Victoria College, Jersey
British World War II prisoners of war
World War II prisoners of war held by Japan
Royal Navy officers of World War II
Ambassadors of the United Kingdom to Kuwait
High Commissioners of the United Kingdom to Singapore
Ambassadors of the United Kingdom to Sweden
High Commissioners of the United Kingdom to Nigeria
European civil servants
Knights Commander of the Order of St Michael and St George
Knights Commander of the Royal Victorian Order
Recipients of the Distinguished Service Cross (United Kingdom)
Commanders Grand Cross of the Order of the Polar Star
British officials of the European Union